The Central Banat District is one of seven administrative districts of the autonomous province of Vojvodina, Serbia. It lies in the geographical region of Banat. According to the 2011 census results, it has a population of 186,851 inhabitants. The administrative center is the city of Zrenjanin.

Name
In Serbian, the district is known as Srednjobanatski okrug or Средњобанатски округ, in Croatian as Srednjobanatski okrug, in Hungarian as Közép-bánsági körzet, in Slovak as Sredobanátsky okres, in Romanian as Districtul Banatul Central, and in Rusyn as Стредобанатски окрух.

Municipalities
It encompasses the city of Zrenjanin and the following municipalities:
 Novi Bečej
 Nova Crnja
 Žitište
 Sečanj

Demographics

According to the last official census done in 2011, the Central Banat District has 187,667 inhabitants.

Ethnic groups
Ethnic composition of the Central Banat district:

Churches
There are many buildings that stand out by their beauty: the Orthodox Church of Assumption from 1746, the Roman Catholic Church in Arač from 13th century and the Roman Catholic Cathedral from 1868 and the Reformatory Church from 1891.

See also
 Administrative divisions of Serbia
 Districts of Serbia
 Former Torontál County of Lands of the Crown of Saint Stephen

References

Note: All official material made by Government of Serbia is public by law. Information was taken from official website.

External links

 

 
Geography of Vojvodina
Banat
Districts of Vojvodina